Róbert Suba (born 17 July 1980) is a Hungarian paracanoeist. He won a silver medal at the 2016 Summer Paralympics in the Men's KL1, and has also won several medals from 2014 to 2018 at the World Championships in the KL1 and/or VL1 classes.

References

1980 births
Living people
People from Kiskunhalas
Hungarian male canoeists
Paracanoeists of Hungary
Paralympic medalists in paracanoe
Paralympic silver medalists for Hungary
Paracanoeists at the 2016 Summer Paralympics
Medalists at the 2016 Summer Paralympics
ICF Canoe Sprint World Championships medalists in paracanoe
Sportspeople from Bács-Kiskun County
21st-century Hungarian people